Félix Romero (born 26 February 1972) is a Cuban handball player. He competed in the men's tournament at the 2000 Summer Olympics.

References

External links
 

1972 births
Living people
Cuban male handball players
Olympic handball players of Cuba
Handball players at the 2000 Summer Olympics
Place of birth missing (living people)
Handball players at the 2007 Pan American Games
Pan American Games competitors for the Dominican Republic
Pan American Games medalists in handball
Pan American Games gold medalists for Cuba
Pan American Games silver medalists for Cuba
Medalists at the 1995 Pan American Games
Medalists at the 1999 Pan American Games
Handball players at the 1999 Pan American Games